The Chinook Display Team is an aerobatics display team in the Royal Air Force based at RAF Odiham. The team flies the UK variant Boeing CH-47 Chinook, and is composed of volunteers from front-line aircrew who train and execute air show performances between day-to-day primary military operations. Their regular performances are popular due to public support for the Chinook's military role, its recognizability, and the variation in display and maneuvers it provides to an air show.

Background

The Royal Air Force's 60 UK-variant Boeing CH-47 Chinooks are based at RAF Odiham in Hampshire. This is the largest fleet of Chinooks other than those operated by the United States Army. The aircraft is capable of carrying up to 55 troops and 10 tonnes of mixed cargo. 

The Odiham squadrons provided Chinooks for demonstration and display flights in the UK. As demand for aerobatic maneuvers grew, a designated Chinook Display Team was created.  Unlike the RAFs dedicated aerobatic display teams (e.g.: Red Arrows, Battle of Britain Memorial Flight), the RAF Chinook Display Team is composed of volunteers from front-line aircrew. They continue day-to-day primary military missions as they train, plan and execute air show appearances. In 2013, they were serving in Afghanistan, while continuing to provide displays at air shows. Similarly, the Chinooks they fly are also used for resupply, trooping, and battlefield casualty evacuation. Their routines are carefully choreographed, so as to not put too much stress on the airframe.

RAF Odiham received a new £53m Lockheed Martin helicopter training flight simulator in 2018, greatly reducing the training costs for Chinook crews, including the Chinook Display Team.

Displays

Solo Chinook shows returned to the UK display circuit in 2004 after a 12-year absence. Since then, they have made regular appearance at air shows where their maneuvers include the "Rollercoaster" – a series of steep climbs and dives at an angle of up to 70 degrees.

At the Duxford Air Show in 2019, the team used Chinook ZA708.  This was built in 1981 and so has had extensive operational service, including overseas deployments in which it saw action and suffered combat damage.  Built originally to Helicopter, Cargo Mark 1 (HC1) specification, it has been upgraded to the latest specification.  To maintain its life and operational serviceability, the stunts performed at airshows are carefully regulated to minimise damage to the airframe.

In 2018 and 2019, the Display Team partnered with Land Rover for support. The vehicle wrap  which was Chinook-themed  was recognized as artistically successful, and was designed by a member of the aircrew.  As one site noted: "This project was completed within the Ministry of Defence and not under Dynamic Vectors. It serves only as an illustration of what some of our designers can do."

The Display Team made a notable appearance at the Battle of Britain Memorial in conjunction with the 100th anniversary of the RAF.

The Chinook Display Team's popularity has been attributed by Flight Lieutenant Stuart Kynaston, the 2018 team captain, to the Chinook's high-profile role in evacuating injured personnel in Afghanistan, its recognizability, unexpected agility, and the display variation it provides in contrast to smaller, faster aircraft.

Team members
The flight team consists of a Captain, three pilots and three crewmen. In 2021, these members were:
 Captain: Flight Lieutenant Matthew Smyth
 Pilots: Flight Lieutenants Simon Flynn and Paul Huyton
 Crewmen: Sergeants Thomas Best, Stewart Gibson, and Danny Gilderson

The team also has five engineering and support staff (ground crew).

See also
 Battle of Britain Memorial Flight

References

Notes

Citations

Bibliography

Further reading

External links
 
 
 

Royal Air Force
British aerobatic teams
Organisations based in Hampshire
Military units and formations of the Royal Air Force